Jeremiah Cocklyn, better known by the name Thomas Cocklyn (fl. 1717–1719), was an English pirate known primarily for his association with Howell Davis, Olivier Levasseur, Richard Taylor, and William Moody.

History

Cocklyn was among the hundreds of pirates who accepted a royal pardon when new Governor Woodes Rogers arrived in the Bahamas in 1718. He soon returned to piracy: in early 1719 near Cape Verde aboard Rising Sun, a group of William Moody's sailors led by Cocklyn attempted a mutiny. Moody marooned Cocklyn and 25 others, denying them shares of treasure. Moody's crew, angry over his treatment of Cocklyn, returned the favor by setting Moody and 12 of his supporters adrift in a small boat. The Rising Sun’s crew elected French pirate Olivier Levasseur as captain. They returned to meet the marooned sailors, who had overpowered a ship on the river and chosen Cocklyn as their leader. William Snelgrave, one of their captives, reported that they “chose Cocklyn for their commander because of his brutality, being determined they said, never again to have a gentleman commander such as Moody was.”

Soon met by Howell Davis near the Sierra Leone River, the group captured a number of vessels in quick succession, including Snelgrave's Bird Galley. The pirates exchanged ships several times, each keeping best of the lot, finally leaving the captured snow Bristol to Snelgrave and his crew. Snelgrave had been fond of Davis, who protected him, but was wary of the cruelty of Cocklyn, having witnessed him caning his own sailors and torturing captives and slaves. Cocklyn and his 25 men took Snelgrave's Bird, renaming it Windham Galley. This showed the Jacobite sympathies of Cocklyn and Levasseur, both of whom named their ships (Windham Galley and Duke of Ormond, respectively) after prominent supporters of the exiled James Stuart.

The three captains eventually quarrelled and went their separate ways. Cocklyn continued his piracies off the African coast through 1719, operating alongside Richard Taylor. By 1720 he was at Madagascar; at least one source reported that Cocklyn died there, with captaincy of his recently captured ship Victory going to Richard Taylor, who afterwards sailed with Levasseur, Edward England, and Jasper Seagar. Another source reports that Cocklyn was hanged for piracy.

See also
Paulsgrave Williams - Former pirate captain, later Levasseur's quartermaster; he had earlier sailed with Samuel Bellamy, who had also sailed with Levasseur in early 1717.

Further reading
Snelgrave, William. "A new account of some parts of Guinea, and the slave-trade". London: P. Knapton, 1734.

Notes

References

18th-century pirates
Year of death missing
Pardoned pirates
English pirates
Piracy in the Indian Ocean
Year of birth uncertain